Kostiantyn Pylypovych Yastrub (25 February 1935 – 20 January 2022) was a Ukrainian politician. A member of the Communist Party, he served as Chairman of the Cherkasy Oblast Council from 1991 to 1992. He died on 20 January 2022, at the age of 86.

References

1935 births
2022 deaths
People from Vinnytsia Oblast
National University of Life and Environmental Sciences of Ukraine alumni
Communist Party of the Soviet Union members
Soviet politicians
Ukrainian politicians